The World Music Festival Chicago is an annual musical event held in Chicago, Illinois, since 1999. It is organized by the City of Chicago. The festival takes place in September, usually runs 5–10 days, and has featured musicians from over 75 countries since its inception.

Featured performers
Performers at the festival have included:
 Rahim AlHaj
 Maria de Barros
 Bomba Estereo
 Bulgarika
 Fatoumata Diawara
 Joaquin Diaz
 Los Gaiteros de San Jacinto
 Sergent Garcia
 Hanggai
 Janka Nabay
 Nawal Quartet
 Slavic Soul Party!
 Staff Benda Bilili
 Sidi Toure

References

External links
 World Music Festival Chicago

Music festivals in Chicago